Meng Junjie (born 22 April 2001) is a Chinese footballer currently playing as a forward for Chengdu Rongcheng.

Club career
Meng Junjie was promoted to the senior team of Chengdu Rongcheng within the 2020 China League One season and would make his debut in a league game on 10 October 2020 against Suzhou Dongwu in a 1-0 victory. He would be a regular part of the team as the club gained promotion to the top tier at the end of the 2021 league campaign.

Career statistics
.

References

External links

2001 births
Living people
Chinese footballers
Association football forwards
China League One players
Chengdu Rongcheng F.C. players